Njongo Lobe Priso Doding (born 24 December 1988) is a Cameroonian footballer who currently plays for SK Victoria Wanderers FC.

Career
On 9 July 2008, Njongo Priso signed a contract with Valletta F.C., with whom he won Maltese National League 100 Anniversary Cup and Maltese FA Trophy.

In 2010, Cyprus side AEK Larnaca signed Njongo Priso on a season-long loan deal, with an option to make the move permanent. On 30 August 2010, he made his debut as a second-half substitute in a 2–1 defeat of Omonia. He scored his first goal for AEK in a 1–1 draw at Ermis Aradippou on 26 February 2011. At the end of the season, Priso joined AEK on a free transfer, however Valletta agreed to receive a percentage of any future transfer fee.

Priso moved to Bulgarian club CSKA Sofia on 19 January 2012,
for an undisclosed fee believed to be around €320,000. On 25 March, he received a red card in the 3–0 away win over Lokomotiv Plovdiv in an A Group match after an altercation with Dakson. Priso was subsequently banned for seven matches, two for a red card and five due to engaging in confrontation with local police officers in the aftermath of the sending off. The second ban was later reduced from five to two matches on appeal. Priso left PFC CSKA Sofia by mutual agreement on 12 July 2013.

On 16 July 2013, he signed a two-year contract with Romanian Liga I side FC Petrolul Ploiești. He made his debut on 29 July, after coming on as a late substitute in the 1–1 home draw with Pandurii Târgu Jiu in a league match and scored his first goal a month later in the 2–1 win over Swansea City A.F.C. in a UEFA Europa League game. In early 2015, he became one of Hungarian club Győri ETO's winter signings. His spell with the team turned out to be short due to the club's eventual bankruptcy.

On 7 June 2015, Priso resigned for Valletta FC.

On 31 August 2019 Victoria Wanderers announced that Priso had joined the club.

International career
Priso has represented Cameroon at U-23 level.

Personal life
He is married to a Maltese national.

Honours
Valletta
Maltese FA Trophy: 2009–10
Maltese Super Cup: 2007–08
Sliema Wanderers
Maltese FA Trophy: 2015–16

References

External links
 
 
 

1988 births
Living people
Cameroonian footballers
Cameroonian expatriate footballers
Fovu Baham players
Msida Saint-Joseph F.C. players
Valletta F.C. players
AEK Larnaca FC players
PFC CSKA Sofia players
FC Petrolul Ploiești players
Győri ETO FC players
Sliema Wanderers F.C. players
Ermis Aradippou FC players
Mosta F.C. players
Pembroke Athleta F.C. players
Ħamrun Spartans F.C. players
First Professional Football League (Bulgaria) players
Liga I players
Cypriot First Division players
Nemzeti Bajnokság I players
Maltese Premier League players
Expatriate footballers in Malta
Expatriate footballers in Cyprus
Expatriate footballers in Bulgaria
Expatriate footballers in Romania
Expatriate footballers in Hungary
Cameroonian expatriate sportspeople in Malta
Cameroonian expatriate sportspeople in Bulgaria
Cameroonian expatriate sportspeople in Romania
Cameroonian expatriate sportspeople in Hungary
Association football midfielders
Gozo Football League First Division players